Rotbusch is a locality in the municipality Schmallenberg in the district Hochsauerlandkreis in North Rhine-Westphalia, Germany.

The hamlet has 2 inhabitants and lies in the west of the municipality of Schmallenberg at a height of around 510 m. Rotbusch borders on the villages of Brenschede, Bracht, Hebbecke and Gleierbrück.

References

Villages in North Rhine-Westphalia
Schmallenberg